Ron Smith (4 September 1916 – 23 January 1979) was an Australian rules footballer who played with Essendon and North Melbourne in the Victorian Football League (VFL).

Notes

External links 
		

1916 births
1979 deaths
Australian rules footballers from Victoria (Australia)
Essendon Football Club players
North Melbourne Football Club players